The Cooey Canuck was the first rifle model produced by Canadian arms designer Herbert William Cooey in 1919. It was a single-shot bolt-action rifle chambered in the .22 or .25 rimfire cartridge. Different versions of this rifle were made in Toronto until 1929. Cooey also produced a junior and .410 gauge versions of this firearm.

See also 
Cooey 60

References 

https://calibremag.ca/cooey-canadas-gunmaker/

Single-shot bolt-action rifles
.22 LR rifles